Harry Malcolm Hedgpeth (September 4, 1888 – July 30, 1966) was a Major League Baseball pitcher. Hedgepth played in one game for the Washington Senators on October 3, .

External links

1888 births
1966 deaths
Major League Baseball pitchers
Baseball players from North Carolina
Washington Senators (1901–1960) players
Morristown Jobbers players
Cleveland Counts players
Petersburg Goobers players
People from Fayetteville, North Carolina